Metcalfe is a locality in central Victoria, Australia. The name 'Metcalfe' probably derives from Baron (Charles) Metcalfe, Governor-General of India and later of Canada, who died in 1846. Metcalfe lies on the Coliban River, downstream from the Malmsbury reservoir.

Metcalfe was developed mainly during the central Victorian gold rush of 1851–1865. It is reported that in 1851, when the first miners arrived on the Mount Alexander goldfield, near Castlemaine, gold nuggets could be picked up without digging. Nearby reserves still bear the scars of mining activity including deep shafts and adits.

In 1861 the Metcalfe road board was established, and in 1865 the Shire of Metcalfe was declared and the shire hall was constructed. The shire hall still contains the record of all councillors and mayors from then until the dissolution of the shire in 1995.

For most of its history the major economic activity has been grazing. Recent (2015) purchases of large grazing properties have been made by Chinese interests.

At times, Metcalfe has had a school, a post office, a pub and various other businesses, but all of these are now closed. However, Metcalfe currently does have a recreation reserve that has a tennis court and playground. With the opening of the Calder Freeway the volume of traffic travelling via Metcalfe between Kyneton and Bendigo reduced significantly.

Metcalfe Post Office opened on 13 December 1866.

Attractions
At the 'Cascades', just to the west of the village, the Coliban River flows over and among huge granite boulders and outcrops, creating many rock pools, small and large. The place is popular all year round for walks, picnics and swimming.

The Metcalfe Tractor Pull, held in September each year, attracts participants and spectators from all over the state, and beyond.

References

External links

Towns in Victoria (Australia)